Imperium Europa is a neo-fascist political party in Malta. It was founded in 2000 by Norman Lowell, who is also its leader. Its primary aim is to unite Europe into one political entity.

Party programme
Imperium Europa is positioned on the far-right on the political spectrum and it has been described as a neo-Nazi, neo-fascist, right-wing populist, radical right, and white nationalist party. As stated in its program, its goal is to unite all European natives under one flag, hence the name "Imperium Europa", leading to "a Europid bond forged through spirituality closely followed by race, nurtured through high culture, protected by high politics, enforced by the elite." Imperium Europa is also opposed to immigration. It is Eurosceptic and advocates for Malta to leave the European Union. Imperium Europa has connections with the French Nouvelle Droite. 

It was officially registered as a political party in 2019, but soon went inactive. Its leader, Lowell, has expressed sympathy for Adolf Hitler.

Proposal for institutional reform
The party advocates a temporary national unity government, a dual system of elitist and democratic elements in order to protect the elite minority whilst simultaneously allowing democratic freedom. This would occur by having the populace democratically elect a President, who would select experts from every field to form a technocratic Cabinet, similar to that formed by Lamberto Dini in Italy in 1995.

Concurrently, there would still be the current Parliament, informing the nation of the cabinet's policies while simultaneously gathering feedback. After four years, a referendum would be held to determine whether the people want this system or go back to the parliamentary representative democratic system. If the former is chosen, the President and technocrats would carry on for another five years, while the parliamentarians would be dismissed with an attractive pension in return.

Other priorities
A dynamic foreign policy.
Civil liberties: freedom of speech, and freedom of association.
Allowing abortion

Electoral history

House of Representatives elections
Campaigning strongly against illegal immigrants, Lowell was the party's candidate in the 11th and 12th Districts in the March 2008 parliamentary election. He obtained 84 votes on first count from both districts, obtaining 0.03% of the overall votes.

European parliamentary elections
Norman Lowell was the party's candidate in the first European Parliament elections that were held in Malta on 12 June 2004. He obtained 1,603 first-count votes from a total of 250,691 votes cast (0.64%).  In the 2009 European Parliament elections, Lowell obtained 3,359 first-count votes (a 122% increase over the 2008 MEP elections).  Mr. Lowell ran again in 2014 and got 7,000 votes, more than double the 2009 MEP result.

References

External links

Political parties in Malta
New Right (Europe)
Political parties established in 2000
2000 establishments in Malta
Maltese nationalism
Neo-Nazi political parties in Europe
Pan-European nationalism
Far-right political parties
Racism in Malta